Roland Winzel Carter (1892–1960) was an Indigenous Australian who was born in Raukkan, South Australia, and was the first of the Ngarrindjeri people to enlist in the First Australian Imperial Force to fight in World War I.

Carter was wounded and captured during combat at Noreuil  in northern France on 2 April 1917.  He was initially held as a prisoner of war at Zerbst in Germany and later at the Halbmondlager POW camp where he and  Douglas Grant were the only Australian aboriginal soldiers in a camp intended principally for the holding of Moslem prisoners of war.

Following the war, Carter was repatriated to England and then to South Australia where he returned to Raukkan where he lived until his death.

References

Further reading

Australian soldiers
1892 births
1960 deaths
Indigenous Australian military personnel
Australian prisoners of war
World War I prisoners of war held by Germany
Ngarrindjeri people
Military personnel from South Australia
Australian military personnel of World War I
Australian Army soldiers